Dasystoma kurentzovi is a moth in the family Lypusidae. It was described by Alexandr L. Lvovsky in 1990. It is found in south-eastern Siberia.

References

Moths described in 1990
Lypusidae